The Paso Del Norte Group (PDNG) is a private organization of approximately 360 business and civic leaders of El Paso, Texas, United States. The group, meant to be representative of the El Paso region, also includes members from Ciudad Juárez, Mexico, and Southern New Mexico.

Patterned after similar leadership groups in cities across the country, and specifically the Commercial Club of Chicago, Illinois, a venerable institution that stepped out of the background and into the middle of public policy issues several years ago, the Paso Del Norte Group is involved in promoting—quietly—such major policy initiatives as the Regional Mobility Authority and the Medical School of the Americas.

History
Much of the group's history and past actions have not been made public. Most of what has been made public about the group was acquired via the Freedom of Information Act.

The Council was made up of 40 CEOs, and focused on research-based public policy. After several years, The group failed to move forward and serve its potential, so it changed its name in 2003 to “El Paso Business Leadership Council”. Hunt served as the initial chairman; into 2004, with Bob Hoy as chairman, Myrna Deckert was brought in as COO. She, in turn, with Jack Cardwell, who founded the Petro chain of truck stops and gas stations, and William Sanders, a real estate developer who brought his Verde Realty Group to El Paso, developed the current structure. In March 2004 the group changed its name to “Paso Del Norte Group.”

Sanders, in particular, has been described as a driving force in developing the Paso Del Norte Group. Sanders, who originally is from El Paso but made his fortune in Chicago, brought a model from that city—the Commercial Club, a storied organization of great influence in that city. He is the co-founder of the Paso del Norte Group.

Leadership
In a July 21, 2006 article in the El Paso Times, Myrna Deckert is indicated to be the "president and CEO of the Paso Del Norte Group".

In a May 19, 2006 email newsletter, Lisa Colquitt Muñoz was indicated to have accepted a staff position of Deputy Chief Operating Officer.

Group Practices

Most members are required to sign confidentiality agreements upon gaining membership. Some members deny having signed any such agreement.

Members are charged an annual fee of $750 to $1,800 generally.

The group meets as a body two or three times a year. While members meet as a body only a few times a year, the group as a whole is divided into task forces that meet regularly, covering, among other areas: downtown; military; health care; education; water; and transportation.

The PDNG has been described by members as a group of civic and business leaders that employs members within.

The group sponsors speakers for breakfast or dinner meetings; as was the case on Thursday, May 18, 2006. U.S. Energy Secretary Samuel Bodman was scheduled to be a speaker at the El Paso Country Club.

The El Paso Downtown Plan

It is the Downtown Plan, that recently pushed the PDNG into public view.

Although the vast majority of the group's actions have been cloaked in secrecy, a select few details have been developed. Before making the plan public, the PDNG undertook several important steps to ensure the plan's success.

On Feb. 15, 2006, the City Council and Mayor John Cook renewed the process by approving the ongoing development of the Master Plan.

The Paso Del Norte Group's Foundation raised funds from the following sources:

A Downtown Redevelopment Task Force, a local volunteer group of PDNG members, was established under the criteria that no member of the Task Force was allowed to own any property in downtown El Paso.

The Task Force solicited bids from three of the world's leading urban planning firms and hired SMWM (at a reported cost of $284,000.00 to the group) which has extensive experience in planning for redevelopment of urban areas. The Task Force spent thousands of hours on this project with the primary objective to develop a comprehensive Master Plan for Downtown El Paso that would be economically viable and feasible to implement.

Once a plan was formulated, a contract with the City of El Paso was forged to establish a loose partnership between the city and the Paso Del Norte Group.

The contract with the city for the Downtown Plan actually was with the PDNG Foundation, a 501(c)(3) organization that operates as a supporting agency to the Paso Del Norte Group, a 501(c)(6) business leadership organization.

The Task Force leadership is said to meet consistently with the Mayor and City Council members to brief them on the progress of the plan. In addition, reports have supposedly been sent regularly to the City Manager and to the Economic Development Administration.

The El Paso Downtown redevelopment Plan Does not go without controversy however. Opponents say they are for revitalization of downtown but  criticize the Paso Del Norte Group plan for several reasons:

 The plan includes the use of eminent domain to transfer land to private developers. The opponents believe this violates Texas laws prohibiting the use of eminent domain for commercial development.
The predominantly working-class Mexican American neighborhood played a crucial role in the history of immigration, the Mexican Revolution, the Cristero War and the renaissance of the Chicano movement in the 60s and 70s. The opponents argue that none of the residents, business owners, or community groups within the "redevelopment zone" in the Segundo Barrio were consulted before the area was charted as a place for the proposed strip malls and parking garages. The plan will forcibly relocate about 1,800 residents.
 The plan was carried out in a secretive and non-inclusive manner for two years by the Paso Del Norte Group members who kept their membership list secret until May 2006. Opponents do not believe the PDNG group is truly representative of the El Paso population that is overwhelmingly Mexican American.
 Opponents question the decision of El Paso City Council representative Robert "Beto" O'Rourke to not recuse himself from voting on the Paso Del Norte Group downtown plan. O'Rourke is the son-in-law of the real-estate developer Bill Sanders. They argued that this was a conflict of interest and filed a complaint to  the City's ethics commission. On October 11, 2006 the Ethics Commission voted the opponents has not met the burden of the conflict-of-interest charges.

Supporters argue that downtown properties are not paying their fair share in property taxes, and that El Paso's downtown is generally under-performing. Opponents argue that the PDNG has been exaggerating these claims since many business district outside of downtown pay even less in taxes than the downtown businesses do.

Various protest groups have formed to combat the implementation of the plan including most prominently the Land Grab Opponents of El Paso which has announced that it will fight the city in court over the proposed plan unless the City Council takes the possible use of eminent domain off the table. The group has hired Dallas attorney Stuart Blaugrund, a former El Pasoan, for representation. As well, a handful of support groups have also formed, many branching off from the PDNG, like Move El Paso Forward and Somos El Paso.

Other key opposition groups include Downtown Revitalization Coalition, El Paso del Sur, Centro Chicano, Inc, Union Plaza Property Owners Association, We the People of El Paso, Centro De Los Trabajadores Agricolas Freonterizos, and The El Paso Korean Chamber of Commerce.

Prominent individuals within the city have mobilized to oppose the plan as well. David Dorado Romo, historian and author of Ringside Seat to a Revolution: An Underground Cultural History of El Paso and Juárez, has criticized the plan for the proposed demolition of several historical buildings including the site where the first novel of the Mexican Revolution, Los de Abajo, was printed in 1915 and the home of the first African American graduate of the U.S. Military Academy Henry Flipper. In addition, Father Rafael Garcia of Sacred Heart Church, El Paso Bishop Armando Ochoa, Yolanda Leyva, a UTEP history professor, County Attorney José Rodriguez, former Judge Alicia Chacon and community activist Pete Duarte have all spoken out against the plan individually.

At the El Paso City Council meeting held on July 9, 2006, it was decided to prohibit the use of eminent domain during the first year that the Downtown Revitalization Plan is implemented. The resolution was adopted just before 11 p.m. during a special meeting that lasted more than four hours and was attended by about 400 people.

Amidst pressure, the City of El Paso has suggested the plan be re-engineered to better suit the community. Yet, opposition groups say recent revisions made to the plan have not corrected its flaws. The roots of the controversy such as the proposed use of eminent domain to transfer land to private developers, has been postponed but will be used if after a year the local owners do not wish to sell their property. At a July 17, 2006 Better Business Bureau luncheon hosted by the PDNG and the City of El Paso, opponents and downtown business owners alike were presented with a revised version of the plan. Those attending the luncheon were told the new plan would benefit El Paso in the following ways

 It will improve Downtown's tax base and help out overtaxed homeowners. Opponents argue that the City has refused to state how much this plan will actually cost the taxpayers.
 Planners think the arts and culture walk will become to Latino art what Santa Fe is to Indian art, especially if the walk is extended into Juárez.
 The "lifestyle" district will include mixed shopping, entertainment, restaurants and housing, bringing life to Downtown at night.
 A multipurpose arena that will complement the convention center will help attract new hotels and give El Paso a shot at much larger conventions.
 A modern mercado that could rival the popular Mercado La Paloma in Los Angeles.

Opponents remain unsatisfied as worries over the proposed use of eminent domain has not been remedied.

On June 21, 2006 Morgan Stanley Real Estate announced they had entered into a three-year, $150 million-public-private equity partnership to develop properties and assets National Capital Revitalization Corp. owns throughout the Downtown El Paso area, only leading to more controversy and upset by those within the proposed redevelopment zone.

On September 14, 2006 the El Paso Central Business Association (CBA) voted to endorse a resolution opposing the plan. The resolution “calls upon the City Council to immediately vacate its March 31  and July 10 resolutions, and table all further discussion of the Downtown Plan until the use of eminent domain that is not for public use or that is intended for private entity to private entity transfer is removed from the Downtown Plan.” Edie Zuvanich, who plays a key role in one of the opposition group, the Unified Downtown Revitalization Coalition, said that the CBA called the meeting to discuss a resolution to endorse the Downtown Plan. City Manager Joyce Wilson wrote a letter in opposition to the CBA meeting. The letter was read at the beginning of the meeting. Zuvanich Also publicly commented on the Downtown Management District, which is a tax district that shares administrative staff with the CBA, and ironically put $100,000 toward the plan. “$100,000 of our businesses taxes went to fund the PDNG plan, not to clean the streets or what it's supposed to be used for,” Zuvanich said.

Plan supporters have begun an advertising campaign, which includes contracting with a Green Bay call-taking company to sign up supporters to write letters to the editor and attend public meetings.

The new plan, with a more comprehensive narrative, is to be presented at the next meeting of the City Plan Commission, Thursday September 21, 2006. At which time, the process of incorporating the Downtown Plan into the city's master plan will commence. Meetings are scheduled for September 28 at the Civic Center and October 5 in City Hall, where the City Plan Commission will vote, and culminating in a vote by City Council to approve the plan on October 10, according to a schedule given to members of the Paso Del Norte Group. A draft of the material is floating around City Hall, but city officials said that since it is still in draft form it is not public information. “Until we have a draft in final format to go public with there is nothing available,” City Manager Wilson said.

Before the Plan Commission meets, city lawyers are reviewing whether two of the members have a conflict of interest that would keep them from voting.

Veronica Rosales, a former planner with the city and a member of the City Plan Commission, also is a member of the Paso Del Norte Group's Downtown Plan committee, and helped develop the plan before leaving the city more than a year ago. “I'm not sure if I'm going to vote on this. I think we're going to end up getting a legal opinion. Personally I would feel more comfortable if I abstained, but I know there are no conflicts since I worked on it so long ago as staff, and haven't been involved since March,” Rosales said.

The other member who might have a conflict is Charlie Gallinar, a planner for La Fe who also helped develop and promote the Downtown Plan. He could not be reached for comment. Gus Haddad, the Plan Commission Chairman, said “I've requested our attorney to look into those two matters.

On November 20, 2006, Two County Commissioners were outraged as the city asks the county not to participate in a key part of the city's downtown revitalization plan. The mayor's Chief of Staff Sylvia Borunda Firth, Deputy City Manager Pat Adauto and the Paso Del Norte Group's Myrna Deckert were dismissed by the Commissioners court after deleting the city's requests from the day's agenda.

City officials gave a presentation at the meeting, voicing their intent to create a tax increment refinancing zone (TIRZ). They also asked the county to waive its right to have any part in it. Neither of the two agenda items sought county participation but Larry Medina expressed his disgust with the city for approaching the county now, months after adopting the plan from the Paso del Norte Group.

He said Firth's belated presentation "is a perfect example of the disrespect that this plan and the proponents of this plan and the people who started this plan in secret ... have shown to this community." "I am against this plan, not because I am against a plan," Medina said. "I am for a plan to revitalize our Downtown area and the Segundo Barrio. This plan I am totally against it because of the way it was started in secret."

Cook said the city, never counting on support from other taxing jurisdictions, can go ahead with the establishment of the tax increment finance zone next month as planned.

Asking the county, El Paso Independent School District and El Paso Community College district if they want to invest any of their Downtown tax revenues in the Downtown plan is only a formality required by state law.

Medina and Commissioner Betti Flores were also upset that city officials were asking them to waive their rights for advance notice of the creation of the tax district and for an appointment of a director to the TIRZ board.

The court unanimously voted to delete the two items from the agenda, meaning the county will have a voice in the taxing district.

Medina offered a grim prediction of what may happen: "If you go forward with this plan, you will hit obstacle after obstacle, you'll hit lawsuit after lawsuit, picket after picket, and you know what's going to happen at the end?" he said. "Ten, 12, 15 years from now, we're going to have three or four scattered buildings, three or four blocks that were actually done and redone."

Members

Membership is a private organization.

Past members

 Antonio Aguirre
 Jennifer Barr Ardovino
 W.T. "Bill" Barnhouse, III
 Richard Black
 Sherman Bodner
 Sergio Borunda Flores
 Chana Burton
 Tom Casaday
 Chuck Dodson
 John Ferrell
 John Geske
 Don Hairston
 Wallace (Ben) Hobson
 Amy Hussmann
 Vanessa Johnson
 W. Park Kerr
 Enoch Kimmelman
 Lance Levine
 Cookie Mapula
 Bea Martinez
 Col. Roger Mathews
 William J. 'Bill' McCamley
 Mace Miller
 Christopher Multhauf
 Cindy Nance
 Beto O'Rourke
 Raymond Palacios
 Margaret Perez
 Laura Pople
 Raul Prieto
 Gwen Pulido
 Gerardo Rodriguez
 Veronica Rosales
 Amy Sanders
 Bill Sanders
 Thad Steele
 Bill Struck
 A.F. (Tom) Thomas
 Pat Thomson
 Terrie Todd
 Linda Volk
 Emma Wollschlager Schwartz
 Joe Wardy
 Blanca Enriquez

References

External links
 Official website
 The El Paso Times
 News Paper Tree
 Official El Paso Downtown Revitalization Plan
 Sito Negron - Author, and expert on the Downtown Plan
 City Council Orientation May 2005
 Paso del Sur Website
 Jesus B. Ochoa Website
 Land Grab Opponents of El Paso
 Unified Downtown Revitalization Coalition
 We the People of El Paso
 Centro De Los Trabajadores Agricolas Freonterizos

Economy of El Paso, Texas
Organizations based in El Paso, Texas